Counselor at Crime (also known as The Counsellor) is a 1973 Italian-Spanish crime film directed by Alberto De Martino and starring Tomas Milian, Martin Balsam and Francisco Rabal.

Cast
 Tomas Milian: Thomas Accardo 
 Martin Balsam: Don Antonio Macaluso 
 Francisco Rabal: Vincent Garofalo 
 Dagmar Lassander: Laura Murchison 
 Perla Cristal: Dorothy 
 Carlo Tamberlani: Don Michele Villabate 
 Manuel Zarzo: Dorsiello 
 John Anderson: Don Vito Albanese  
 Sacheen Littlefeather: Maggie  
 George Rigaud: Priest
 Eduardo Fajardo: Calogero Vezza
 Nello Pazzafini: Killer in Polizzi Generosa

Production
Counselor at Crime was filmed at Cinecitta in Rome, Estudios Cinematograficos in Madrid and on location in San Francisco, Albuquerque, Palermo and Sicily.

The cinematography was done by Joe D'Amato, who was credited under his birthname Aristide Massaccesi. Director Alberto de Martino spoke positively on working with D'Amato, stating that he "didn't talk nonsense, he knew how to do his job, and he was quick. It took him a couple of seconds to understand how to light a scene. And whenever he was in trouble with the lighting, he would take the camera in his own hands".

De Martino admitted to having trouble during the screenwriting of the film, stating that he initially wrote the script with his collaborators. They later hired Leonardo Martin to write another part and when they gave the script to producer Edmondo Amati, he stated that it was alright but wanted the dialogue to be revised by his friend Michael Gazzo. A month later, Gazzo sent him a script that was entirely re-written.

De Martino also spoke about Dagmar Lassander, stating that he "cast her in Rome a couple of months before shooting started. She'd just had a baby and I told her she had to lose weight. She said 'Of course, one month's a long time!".  When arriving in Albuquerque, she had not lost the weight and De Martino kept her in the film as he would not be able to find a replacement.

Release
Counselor at Crime was released in Italy on August 30, 1973 where it was distributed by Fida Cinematografica. The film grossed a total of 685,486,000 Italian lire in Italy.

Footnotes

References

See also
 List of Italian films of 1973

External links

1973 films
Films directed by Alberto De Martino
Italian crime films
Spanish crime films
Films shot in San Francisco
Mafia films
1973 crime films
Films scored by Riz Ortolani
1970s Italian films